The Bride is a 1973 Turkish drama film written and directed by Ömer Lütfi Akad about a young woman who moves with her husband and sick child to Istanbul. The film, which won three awards, including best film, at the 5th Adana "Golden Boll" International Film Festival, was voted one of the 10 Best Turkish Films by the Ankara Cinema Association.

Synopsis
A young woman moves with her husband and small child to her husband's family in Istanbul. Her son becomes ill and the doctor tells her that he will soon die if he doesn't get an operation. The family refuses to help her because they can't see anything wrong with the boy and all money is needed for a new shop they have just opened. When her son dies she takes a desperate step.

Release

Festival screenings
 5th Adana "Golden Boll" International Film Festival
 39th Karlovy Vary International Film Festival
 The 2014 BFI London Film Festival

Reception

Awards
 5th Adana "Golden Boll" International Film Festival
 Best Film
 Best Supporting Actor
 Best Supporting Actress

See also 
 1973 in film
 Turkish films of the 1970s

References

External links

1973 films
Turkish drama films
1970s Turkish-language films
Films set in Turkey
1973 drama films